Maratus bubo is a species of the peacock spider genus, characterised by its distinctive courtship display.

References

Further reading
Maddison, Wayne P. "A phylogenetic classification of jumping spiders (Araneae: Salticidae)." Journal of Arachnology 43.3 (2015): 231-292.
Waldock, Julianne M. "A new species of peacock spider, Maratus proszynskii sp. nov.(Araneae: Salticidae: Euophryini), from Tasmania, with a review of Maratus in Tasmania, Australia." RECORDS OF THE WESTERN AUSTRALIAN MUSEUM 144.150 (2015): 150.

External links
BBC News video
Australian Geographic video

Salticidae
Spiders of Australia
Spiders described in 2016